2 Hearts is a 2020 American romantic drama film directed by Lance Hool and starring Jacob Elordi, Adan Canto, Tiera Skovbye and Radha Mitchell. It is based on the true story of Leslie and Jorge Bacardi and Christopher Gregory. The film was theatrically released in the United States on October 16, 2020, receiving generally negative reviews from critics.

Plot  
The film claims to be based on a true story.

Chris, one of the two main characters in the film, is shown standing on a beach, when suddenly the film fast forwards and shows him being wheeled into an operating room. The film rewinds to an earlier decade to the story of Jorge, who is playing soccer when he falls unconscious and also undergoes an operation. The doctor tells his parent that he will probably not live to the age of 20 and should not exert himself. At university, Chris bumps into Samantha (Sam) twice and starts helping her with her "safety buddies" program. An already 30-year-old Jorge meets Leslie, a flight attendant on his flight. He is the son of the Cuban owner of the Bolivar rum brand. While spending time with Jorge in Hawaii, Leslie asks him about his cough and scar and he tells her about his condition off-screen. Jorge proposes to Leslie. Chris, before taking his driving test, fills out a form at the DMV indicating he is willing to be a donor. He tells Sam that she must go on a date with him if he passes the test and they have their first date that night. Sam meets Chris' family during Easter break. Jorge and Leslie get married, without his parents, who apparently disapprove of their son marrying an American woman.

While hanging out with Sam and his two best friends in the dorm, Chris suddenly falls and loses consciousness, and the film shows him being wheeled into the operating room as in the opening scene. Later, a doctor comes into his room, where Sam and Chris' parents and brother are present. When Chris wakes up, he tells Sam he wants to ask her something and the film subsequently shows their marriage. At this point, Chris, the narrator, mentions that years earlier Jorge and Leslie lived a life similar to that of him and Sam but that there were some painful differences. Leslie is shown crying next to a baby crib while Sam is shown to be pregnant. A doctor tells Jorge and Leslie that they can't have children. Chris and Sam go to pregnancy training together, while Jorge's cough gets worse. Jorge is shown with an oxygen generator, while Chris and Sam are shown with their baby. A doctor tells Jorge and Leslie that he has scheduled a lung transplant for Jorge, who is shown being wheeled to his operation in the transplant clinic.

Chris is promoted to lieutenant firefighter and arrives home to share the news with Sam and their son. As the narrator, he says that this is not what actually happened, and the film returns to him being wheeled into the operating room and the doctor coming in to meet him. The next morning, the doctor informs Chris' family that Chris is braindead and that they have found suitable recipients in need of heart, lungs, liver, pancreas, kidneys and eyes, which Chris can donate. Here, the film shows the receivers of the organs getting a phone call. Chris' family is met by Chris' friends who are holding a candle wake in front of the hospital. Jorge comes to after the transplant and asks, "Who is in here breathing for me?" Leslie answers, "An angel, that is all we know." The film proceeds to show Chris' funeral. Jorge insists on knowing who his donor was, and sends a letter of gratitude to Chris' parents, and they send a letter back. Sam and Chris' parents meet with Jorge and Leslie. The final scene shows Chris on the beach as in the opening scene, looking towards Jorge and Leslie's yacht with Sam and his parents on it.

Cast
 Jacob Elordi as Christopher "Chris" Gregory
 Tiera Skovbye as Samantha "Sam" Peters
 Adan Canto as Jorge Bolivar
 Radha Mitchell as Leslie Bolivar

Release
Freestyle Releasing acquired distribution rights to the film in June 2020. The film was originally scheduled to be released on September 11, 2020, but due to the COVID-19 pandemic was pushed to October 16, 2020.

Reception

Box office 
In its opening weekend, 2 Hearts grossed $565,000 from 1,683 theaters. It then made $313,010 in its second weekend.

Critical response 
The website's critics consensus reads: "Its picturesque setting is as agreeable as its noble intentions, but this treacly melodrama proves 2 Hearts aren't necessarily better than one." On Metacritic, it has a weighted average score of 29 out of 100, based on six critics, indicating "generally unfavorable reviews". Audiences polled by CinemaScore gave the film an average grade of "B" on an A+ to F scale.

References

External links
 
 

American romantic drama films
American films based on actual events
2020 films
2020 romantic drama films
Films postponed due to the COVID-19 pandemic
2020s English-language films
Films directed by Lance Hool
2020s American films